Alberts is a Dutch and Afrikaans patronymic surname, meaning "son of Albert".  Alberts is also a Latvian masculine given name, a cognate of the name Albert. People with the name Alberts include:

Surname
 Al Alberts (1922–2009), American singer and composer
 Albert Alberts (1911–1995), Dutch writer, translator, and journalist.
 Andrew Alberts (b. 1981), American ice hockey defenceman
 Anton Alberts (architect) (1927–1999), Dutch architect
 Anton Alberts (politician) (b. 1970), South African lawyer and politician
 Bruce Alberts (b. 1938), American biochemist; President of the National Academy of Sciences 1993–2005
 Bryan Alberts (b. 1994), American–Dutch basketball player
 Butch Alberts (b. 1950), American baseball player
 David S. Alberts (b. 1942), American operations researcher
 Dian Alberts, Dutch soap opera fictional character
 Eunice Alberts (1927–2012), American opera singer
 Gert Alberts (1836–1927), South African trekker leader
 Gus Alberts (1861–1912), American baseball player
 Jaco Alberts (b. c. 1970), South African rugby player
 Jacques Alberts (b. 1991), South African rugby player
 Jos Alberts (b. 1960), Dutch racing cyclist
  (b. 1946), German writer
 Robert Alberts (b. 1954), Dutch football midfielder and manager
 Sjaak Alberts (1926–1997), Dutch football defender
 Trev Alberts (b. 1970), American college football linebacker and sports administrator
 Wayne Alberts (b. 1960s), Australian rugby player 
 Willem Alberts (b. 1984), South African rugby player

Given name
 Alberts Bels (b. 1938), Latvian writer
 Alberts Jērums (1919–1978), Latvian composer
 Alberts Krievs (1902–19??), Latvian wrestler
 Alberts Kviesis (1881–1944), Latvian president
 Alberts Ozoliņš (1896–1985), Latvian weightlifter
 Alberts Rumba (1892–1962), Latvian speed skater
 Alberts Šeibelis (1906–1972), Latvian footballer
 Alberts Tarulis (1906–1927), Latvian footballer
 Alberts Vaters (190?–1928), Latvian footballer

See also
 Aalberts, surname
 Albers, surname
 Albert (given name)
 Albertson (name), surname
 Alberts Frères, Dutch film production companies founded in 1899

References

Afrikaans-language surnames
Dutch-language surnames
Patronymic surnames
Latvian masculine given names
Surnames from given names